West Nyala is a Bantu language of western Kenya, on the shores of Lake Victoria. It is a part of the Luhya branch of Great Lakes Bantu.

References

Languages of Kenya
Nyoro-Ganda languages